The name creeping willowherb can refer to several species of flowering plant:

 Epilobium brunnescens, native to New Zealand and Australia
 
 Epilobium nummulariifolium